Kind of Blue is a 1959 album by Miles Davis.

Kind of Blue may also refer to:

 Kind of Blue (TQ album), 2010
Kind of Blue (book), a book by Kenneth Clarke

See also 
 Different Kind of Blue (disambiguation)